The 2013–14 La Liga season (known as the Liga BBVA for sponsorship reasons) was the 83rd since its establishment. Match days were drawn on 9 July 2013. The season began on 17 August 2013 and concluded on 18 May 2014; all top-flight European leagues ended earlier than the previous season due to the upcoming 2014 FIFA World Cup. Elche, Villarreal and Almería competed in La Liga this season after being promoted from the second tier.

Atlético Madrid, Real Madrid and Barcelona traded the lead several times throughout the season. Entering the final weekend of play, Atlético Madrid were three points ahead of 2013 champions Barcelona. However, with the two teams facing off, Barcelona could claim the title with a win. The game ended in a draw, giving the Colchoneros their first league title in eighteen years, and their tenth overall. It was the first time since the 2003–04 season that a club other than Barcelona or Real Madrid, who finished second and third respectively, had won the title. Osasuna, Valladolid and Real Betis finished in the bottom three and were relegated.

Cristiano Ronaldo won the La Liga Award for Best Player for the first time. As the top scorer with 31 goals, Ronaldo also won the Pichichi Trophy, along with sharing the European Golden Shoe. Ángel Di María had the most assists, with 17. Thibaut Courtois won the Zamora Trophy for best goalkeeper.

Teams

Promotion and relegation (pre-season)
A total of twenty teams contested the league, including seventeen sides from the 2012–13 season and three promoted from the 2012–13 Segunda División. This included the top two ranked teams from the Segunda División, and the victorious team of the play-offs.

Mallorca, Deportivo La Coruña and Zaragoza were relegated to the 2013–14 Segunda División at the end of the previous season; Mallorca were relegated after sixteen years in La Liga, the longest period in the club's history, Zaragoza returned to the Segunda División after a four-year tenure in La Liga, and Deportivo made an immediate return to the second tier after being promoted the previous year. All three teams were relegated on the final matchday.

The three relegated teams were replaced by three 2012–13 Segunda División sides: Elche returned to the top level as Segunda División champions, after 24 years of absence and having spent the last fourteen consecutive seasons in the Segunda División. Second-placed Villarreal were also promoted to La Liga, making an immediate return to the top flight after a win over Almería in a decisive match near the end of the season which would see the winners directly promoted to La Liga. Almería themselves also eventually achieved promotion; the club returned to the Spanish top flight after spending two years in the Segunda by defeating Girona in the final of the promotion play-offs.

This was the first season since the 1988–89 campaign without any teams from the archipelagos of Spain (teams located on the Balearic Islands and Canary Islands) in the top flight, as Mallorca were relegated and Las Palmas failed to return to La Liga after losing in the semi-finals of the promotion play-offs.

Stadium and locations

Personnel and sponsorship

2. On the back of shirt.
3. Barcelona made a donation to UNICEF in order to display the charity's logo on the back of the club's kit.
4. On the shorts.
5. Málaga made a donation to UNESCO in order to display the charity's logo on the club's kit.

As in the previous years, Nike provided the official ball for all matches, with a new Nike Incyte Liga BBVA model being used throughout the season for all matches.

Managerial changes

Notes
 Announcement date. The appointment was made effective since 1 July 2013.

Season summary

The 2013–14 La Liga season was the 83rd since its establishment. Match days were drawn on 9 July 2013. The season began on 17 August 2013 and ended on 18 May 2014.

For the first time since 1951 and just the third time in league history, the La Liga title came down to a head-to-head match on the final weekend of play. Atlético Madrid were three points ahead of 2013 champion Barcelona, but had its final game on the road in Barcelona. Barcelona took a 1–0 lead into the half and Atlético lost two starters to injury in the half.  A second half header, however, secured a 1–1 draw, earning the Colchoneros their first league title in 18 years, and their 10th overall. It was the first time since the 2003–04 La Liga that a club other than Barcelona or Real Madrid, which finished tied for second, won the title. It was also the first time in the 67-year history of the Camp Nou stadium that a visiting team had clinched the title in the stadium.

The emergence of Diego Costa and Koke was a large part of Atlético Madrid's success. Costa scored 36 goals on the season (27 in league play), including the winner in Atlético's first victory over Real Madrid since 1999. Koke had 18 assists on the year (13 in league play), to go with seven goals.

Earlier in the season, Lionel Messi scored a hat-trick as Barcelona ended a 31-match unbeaten streak for Real Madrid. The same day, Atlético beat Real Betis to claim the league lead. A loss against Levante and draw against Málaga left Atlético vulnerable heading into their final match.

Cristiano Ronaldo won the league scoring title with 31 goals. Messi was second and Costa third. Ángel Di María had most assists with 17. Thibaut Courtois won the Ricardo Zamora Trophy for best goalkeeper. Barcelona was the least penalised team.

League table

Results

Season statistics

Top goalscorers
The Pichichi Trophy is awarded by newspaper Marca to the player who scores the most goals in a season.

Source:

Assists table

Zamora Trophy
The Zamora Trophy is awarded by newspaper Marca to the goalkeeper with least goals-to-games ratio. Keepers must play at least 28 games of 60 or more minutes to be eligible for the trophy.

Hat-tricks

4 Player scored four goals5 Player scored five goals(H) – Home ; (A) – Away

Discipline
 Most yellow cards (club): 102
 Málaga
 Most yellow cards (player): 15
 Alberto Botía (Elche)
 Most red cards (club): 8
 Real Betis
 Rayo Vallecano
 Osasuna
 Most red cards (player): 2
 6 players

Attendances

La Liga Awards

Seasonal
La Liga's governing body, the Liga Nacional de Fútbol Profesional, honoured the competition's best players and coach with the La Liga Awards.

Monthly

Number of teams by autonomous community

See also
 List of Spanish football transfers summer 2013
 2013–14 Segunda División
 2013–14 Copa del Rey

References

External links

Official website

 
2013-14
1
Spa